Marilyn Manson is an American rock band from Fort Lauderdale, Florida. Formed in 1989, the group was originally known as Marilyn Manson & the Spooky Kids and featured eponymous vocalist Marilyn Manson (real name Brian Warner), guitarist Daisy Berkowitz (real name Scott Putesky) and bassist Olivia Newton Bundy (real name Brian Tutunick), who were soon joined by keyboardist Zsa Zsa Speck (real name Perry Pandrea). The current line-up includes Manson, guitarist Paul Wiley (a touring member since 2014), bassist Juan Alderete (a touring member since 2017) and drummer Brandon Pertzborn (who joined in 2019).

History

1989–1996
Marilyn Manson and Daisy Berkowitz formed Marilyn Manson & the Spooky Kids in December 1989, adding Olivia Newton Bundy to complete the band's first line-up. After recording their first demo The Raw Boned Psalms the following month, the trio added keyboardist Zsa Zsa Speck (Perry Pandrea) and performed their first string of live shows, before Bundy and Speck were replaced in June 1990 by Gidget Gein (Brad Stewart) and Madonna Wayne Gacy (Stephen Bier), respectively. In August 1991, the Spooky Kids became a five-piece with the addition of their first drummer Sara Lee Lucas (Fred Streithorst), after previously using a drum machine. The group played its last show under the Spooky Kids moniker on August 1, 1992, before it was dropped on the recommendation of their label Nothing Records.

During the recording of the band's full-length debut album Portrait of an American Family, Gein received a notice while in hospital recovering from a heroin overdose that his services "were no longer needed". His bass parts were retained from earlier sessions for The Manson Family Album, but he was subsequently replaced by Twiggy Ramirez (Jeordie White). In March 1995, during the subsequent touring cycle, Lucas left the group after an incident in which Manson lit his drum kit on fire while he was playing. He was replaced by Ginger Fish (Kenny Wilson) in time for the next run of shows. For 1996's Antichrist Superstar, much of the guitars were performed by Ramirez following Berkowitz's earlier departure, due to Manson and producer Trent Reznor's dismissal of many of his songwriting contributions.

1996–2008
Berkowitz was replaced by Zim Zum (Timothy Linton) in time for the Dead to the World Tour which followed the release of Antichrist Superstar. The new guitarist performed on 1998's Mechanical Animals, but left the band during its mixing stages to pursue a solo career, with John 5 (John Lowery) leaving Two to take his place. The Last Tour on Earth and Holy Wood (In the Shadow of the Valley of Death) followed, after which Ramirez left in May 2002 due to creative differences with Manson, to be replaced by Tim Skold. This lineup recorded The Golden Age of Grotesque, before Lowery was dismissed on March 30, 2004, for unknown reasons. In a 2009 interview, Lowery claimed that "It was completely amicable. He just wanted to write with other members of the band, and I wanted to do other things."

Lowery was replaced on the Against All Gods Tour by Mark Chaussee, which started in October 2004. Chris Vrenna also temporarily substituted for Fish on drums, who had been injured after falling from the stage at an awards show the previous month. During 2006 and 2007, Manson and Skold collaborated on the band's next album Eat Me, Drink Me without Fish, although he remained an official member of the group. For the subsequent Rape of the World Tour, Vrenna returned to take Gacy's place on keyboards, initially temporarily. It was later revealed, however, that Gacy had sued Manson for alleged breach of contract relating to use of the band's earnings, and that he hadn't worked with the band for over a year. Rob Holliday performed bass on the 2007 tour, with Skold switching to guitar.

2008–2017
In January 2008, after the first leg of the Rape of the World Tour, Twiggy Ramirez returned to replace the outgoing Tim Skold and took over bass duties, with Holliday switching to guitar. Former Limp Bizkit guitarist Wes Borland took over on guitar in August, but by the following February had left again to reform his original band. After the release of The High End of Low, which featured only Manson, Ramirez and Vrenna, the band toured with Andy Gerold on bass, as Ramirez took up the role of lead guitarist. In July 2010, Fred Sablan took over as Marilyn Manson's official bassist. Long-term drummer Ginger Fish left the band in February 2011, after temporarily touring with Rob Zombie and subsequently opting to join full-time. Vrenna switched roles until November, when he also departed.

In January 2012, Jason Sutter was announced to be the band's drummer for the upcoming Hey Cruel World... Tour. Spencer Rollins was brought in on keyboards and additional guitar for the Masters of Madness Tour in 2013. In November 2013, drummer Gil Sharone shared a video of an unidentified recording session, which was revealed early the following year to have been for the Marilyn Manson band. The new lineup was officially unveiled at the band's first show of the year in June 2014, featuring Tyler Bates and Paul Wiley on guitars, and Ramirez in place of the departed Sablan on bass. The Pale Emperor, released in 2015, featured only Manson, Bates and Sharone, as Ramirez was busy working on other projects during the recording sessions. Daniel Fox joined on keyboards for 2015 tour dates.

2017–present
Heaven Upside Down was released in 2017 and once again did not feature Twiggy Ramirez, after he decided that Bates's initial demo bass recordings were of sufficient quality for the album. In October 2017, between legs of the Heaven Upside Down Tour, Ramirez was fired from the band after becoming the subject of a sexual assault allegation from Jack Off Jill singer Jessicka Addams. He was replaced by Juan Alderete. After the conclusion of Twins of Evil: The Second Coming Tour at the end of 2018, Manson and Bates stopped working together. Sharone also left in March 2019 to work on other projects. He was replaced by Brandon Pertzborn in June, prior to the start of the Twins of Evil: Hell Never Dies Tour. In November 2021, former band member Tim Skold announced that he was once again working on material with Marilyn Manson.

Members

Current

Former

Touring

Timeline

Line-ups

References

External links
Marilyn Manson official website

Marilyn Manson (band) members
Manson, Marilyn
Articles which contain graphical timelines